The Tunisian Football Federation is the governing body of football in Tunisia. It was established in 1957. It became a member in the FIFA in 1960, and in the same year it also became a member in the CAF association. It organises the football league, the Tunisian Ligue Professionnelle 1, the Tunisia national football team and the Tunisia women's national football team. It is based in Tunis.

History 
It was during a meeting held on 9 November 1909 by a provisional committee bringing together sports societies that the first statutes of an official championship were adopted. It was from the 1921-1922 season that the Tunisian championship was regularly organized under the name of “honor division championship”. The Tunisian Cup starts a year later.

As soon as independence was proclaimed in 1956, Tunisian football leaders took the necessary steps to create an exclusively national body to replace the Tunisian Football League (an offshoot of the French Football Federation).

These steps lead to the creation of the Tunisian Football Federation which was approved on 29 March 1957. Recognized as a public utility, the FTF has since been investing in its dual mission of promoting football and managing the national competition as well as the various teams representing Tunisia in international competitions.

Competitions

Current title holders

See also 
 Tunisia national football team
 Tunisia A' national football team
 Tunisia national under-23 football team
 Tunisia national under-20 football team
 Tunisia national under-17 football team
 Tunisia national under-15 football team
 Tunisia women's national football team
 Tunisia women's national under-20 football team
 Tunisia women's national under-17 football team
 Tunisia national futsal team
 Tunisia national beach soccer team

External links

  Federation Tunisienne de Football
 Tunisia at the FIFA website.
   Tunisia at CAF Online

National members of the Confederation of African Football
Football in Tunisia
Football
Sports organizations established in 1956
1956 establishments in Tunisia